James Edward McManus  (October 10, 1900 – July 6, 1976) was an American prelate of the Roman Catholic Church. A Redemptorist, he served as Bishop of Ponce in Puerto Rico (1947–1963) and as an auxiliary bishop of the Archdiocese of New York (1963–1970).

Early life and education
James McManus was born on October 10, 1900, in Brooklyn, New York, the eighth of nine children of William and Elizabeth (née O'Loughlin) McManus. He received his early education at the parochial school of Our Lady of Perpetual Help Church in Brooklyn from 1906 to 1914. In 1915, he enrolled at St. Mary's College, a preparatory school run by the Redemptorists in North East, Pennsylvania. He then studied at Mount St. Alphonsus Seminary at Esopus from 1922 to 1928. He made his profession as a Redemptorist in Ilchester, Maryland, on August 2, 1922.

Priesthood
On June 19, 1927, McManus was ordained to the priesthood in Esopus. He was assigned to the Puerto Rican mission in Caguas in 1929. He later returned to the continental United States to study at the Catholic University of America in Washington, DC, where he earned a Doctor of Canon Law degree in 1937. He then served as professor of canon law at Mount St. Alphonsus Seminary until 1940, when he returned to Puerto Rico. He served as a pastor in Aguadilla (1940–45) and then in Mayagüez (1945–47).

Episcopacy

Ponce
On May 10, 1947, McManus was appointed Bishop of Ponce by Pope Pius XII. He received his episcopal consecration on the following July 1 from Bishop William Tibertus McCarty, with Bishops Aloysius Joseph Willinger and William David O'Brien serving as co-consecrators, at Our Lady of Perpetual Help Church in Brooklyn. His biggest contribution as Bishop of Ponce was the founding of the Pontifical Catholic University of Puerto Rico in 1948. He also oversaw the move of a seminary from the Archdiocese of San Juan to his diocese in Aibonito.

During his tenure in Ponce, McManus became an outspoken critic of Luis Muñoz Marín, who served as Governor of Puerto Rico from 1949 to 1965. In the 1952 and 1956 elections, he opposed Muñoz Marín and supported the Republican Statehood Party, which demanded statehood for the island and proposed an economic plan similar to that of the continental Republican Party. In 1958, he feuded with Muñoz Marín over his program to crack down on gambling, including bingo games for the support of parish churches. He denounced the legalization of birth control measures and a law that would divorce couples who had been separated for more than three years. He also opposed the administration's measure to cut the tax-exempt donations to charity by corporations from 15 percent of gross income to 5 percent of surplus.

In 1960, after the Legislative Assembly failed to pass a law allowing religious instruction for schoolchildren, McManus said that the administration of Muñoz Marín was "responsible for the moral evils that cloud and de-Christianize our society." In August of that year, he helped organize the Christian Action Party, which he urged all Catholics to support. The party nominated Salvador Perea, a professor at the Pontifical Catholic University, as its candidate for governor, but was caught in a controversy over the validity of the signatures it collected to get on the ballot.

A month before the election, McManus and two other bishops issued a pastoral letter that prohibited Catholics from voting for Muñoz Marín's Popular Democratic Party, which they claimed "accepts as its own the morality of a 'regime of license,' denying Christian morality..." The letter also stated, "It is evident that the philosophy of the Popular Democratic Party is anti-Christian and anti-Catholic, and that it is based on the modern heresy that popular will and not divine law decides what is moral and immoral. This philosophy destroys the Ten Commandments of God and permits that they be substituted by popular and human criteria." McManus insisted that Catholics who disobeyed the injunction by voting for the Popular Democrats would commit a sin. The letter resulted in widespread protests in Puerto Rico and sparked open controversy within the Church. Cardinal Francis Spellman of New York declared that Puerto Rican voters would not be penalized by the Church while Archbishop James P. Davis of San Juan defended the bishops. Muñoz Marín denounced the letter as an "incredible medieval interference in a political campaign."

Between 1962 and 1965, McManus attended all four sessions of the Second Vatican Council.

New York
McManus resigned as Bishop of Ponce for reasons of health on November 18, 1963. On the same date, he was appointed Auxiliary Bishop of New York and Titular Bishop of Benda by Pope Paul VI. He denied that his transfer to New York had anything to do with his opposition to Governor Muñoz Marín, calling his appointment "routine." As an auxiliary bishop, he served as pastor of St. Cecilia's Church in Manhattan (1964–1966) and episcopal vicar of Sullivan and Ulster Counties, a post which he held until his retirement in 1970.

McManus died at the Monmouth Medical Center in Long Branch, New Jersey, on July 3, 1976, at age 75.

References

1900 births
1976 deaths
People from Brooklyn
Mount St. Alphonsus Seminary alumni
Catholic University of America alumni
Redemptorist bishops
Participants in the Second Vatican Council
American Roman Catholic missionaries
Roman Catholic missionaries in Puerto Rico
20th-century Roman Catholic bishops in Puerto Rico
Roman Catholic bishops in New York (state)
People of the Roman Catholic Archdiocese of New York
Roman Catholic bishops of Ponce